Cystitis cystica is a relatively common chronic reactive inflammatory disorder thought to be caused by chronic irritation of the urothelium because of infection, calculi, outlet obstruction, or tumor resulting in multiple small filling defects in the bladder wall.

References

Urinary bladder disorders